Charles-François Fournier (May 15, 1805 – in or after 1863) was a land surveyor and political figure in Canada East. He represented L'Islet in the Legislative Assembly of the Province of Canada from 1847 to 1863.

He was born in Saint-Jean-Port-Joli, the son of François Fournier and Catherine Miville-Deschênes. Fournier received his commission as a land surveyor in 1826. He was also a lieutenant colonel in the local militia and a justice of the peace. He was married to Mary Jane Brotherton. Fournier was first elected to the assembly in a by-election held in May 1847. He was defeated by Louis-Bonaventure Caron when he ran for reelection in 1858 but was declared elected later that same year. He was defeated when he ran for reelection in 1863.

References 
 

1805 births
Year of death unknown
Members of the Legislative Assembly of the Province of Canada from Canada East
Canadian justices of the peace
People from Chaudière-Appalaches